Nepomorpha is an infraorder of insects in the "true bug" order (Hemiptera). They belong to the "typical" bugs of the suborder Heteroptera. Due to their aquatic habits, these animals are known as true water bugs. They occur all over the world outside the polar regions, with about 2,000 species altogether. The Nepomorpha can be distinguished from related Heteroptera by their missing or vestigial ocelli. Also, as referred to by the obsolete name Cryptocerata ("the hidden-horned ones"), their antennae are reduced, with weak muscles, and usually carried tucked against the head.

Most of the species within this infraorder live in freshwater habitats. The exceptions are members of the superfamily Ochteroidea, which are found along the water's edge. Many of these insects are predators of invertebrates and in some cases – like the large water scorpions (Nepidae) and giant water bugs (Belostomatidae) – even small fish and amphibians. Others are omnivores or feed on plants. Their mouthparts form a rostrum as in all Heteroptera and most Hemiptera. With this, they pierce their food source to suck out fluids; some, like the Corixidae, are also able to chew their food to some extent, sucking up the resulting pulp. The rostrum can also be used to sting in defence; some, like the common backswimmer (Notonecta glauca) of the Notonectidae can easily pierce the skin of humans and deliver a wound often more painful than a bee's sting.

Systematics

As evidenced by fossils such as the rather advanced Triassocoridae or the primitive water boatman Lufengnacta, the radiation establishing today's superfamilies seems to have been largely complete by the end of the Triassic . There are a large number of fossil genera, but except those placed in Triassocoridae they can at least tentatively be assigned to the extant superfamilies.

Though the systematics and phylogeny of the higher taxa of Nepomorpha were long controversial, cladistic analysis of mitochondrial 16S and nuclear 28S rDNA sequence data and morphology has more recently resolved to near-perfection. The long-accepted superfamilies are all monophyletic, with the exception of the Naucoroidea, which is now monotypic with the Aphelocheiridae and Potamocoridae being split off in a new superfamily Aphelocheiroidea. The Cibariopectinata, a proposed clade established on the presence of cibariopectine structures in the food-sucking pump of some of the most advanced true water bugs (Tripartita), might indeed be monophyletic. Alternatively it might be synonymous with the Tripartita, the Ochteroidea having lost the cibariopectines again due to the different requirements of their (for Nepomorpha) unusual lifestyle.

About seven superfamilies, in evolutionary sequence, from the most ancient to the most modern lineage, have been identified in the Infraorder Nepomorpha:
 †Morrisonnepa (incertae sedis: Morrison Formation, Tithonian ~ 151 Ma.)

Nepoidea
 Family Belostomatidae – giant water bugs
 Family Nepidae – water scorpions

Corixoidea
 Family Corixidae – water boatmen

Ochteroidea
Clade Tripartita
 Family Gelastocoridae – toad bugs
 Family Ochteridae – velvety shore bugs
Clade Cibariopectinata (disputed)
 Family Triassocoridae (fossil, tentatively placed here)

Aphelocheiroidea
 Family Aphelocheiridae
 Family Potamocoridae

Naucoroidea
 Family Naucoridae – creeping water bugs

Notonectoidea
 Family Notonectidae – backswimmers

Pleoidea
Note: sometimes included in Notonectoidea
 Family Helotrephidae
 Family Pleidae – pygmy backswimmers

Footnotes

Further reading